Making Love from Memory is the thirty-fifth solo studio album by American country music singer-songwriter Loretta Lynn. It was released on September 6, 1982, by MCA Records. This was Lynn's only album to not chart on the Billboard Top Country Albums chart during her time at Decca/MCA.

Commercial performance 
The album failed to chart on the Billboard Top Country Albums chart, despite the first single, "Making Love from Memory", peaking at No. 19 on the Billboard Hot Country Songs chart. The album's second single, "Breakin' It", peaked at No. 39.

Track listing

Personnel 
Adapted from album liner notes.

Owen Bradley – producer
David Briggs – synthesizer, piano
Jimmy Capps – rhythm guitar
Gene Chrisman – drums
Ray Edenton – rhythm guitar
Buddy Harman – drums, backing vocals
The Jordanaires – backing vocals
Millie Kirkham – backing vocals
Slick Lawson – photography
Mike Leech – bass
Bret Lopez – photography
Grady Martin – electric guitar
Charlie McCoy – harmonica
Glenn Meadows – mastering
Joe Mills – engineer
Bob Moore – bass
The Nashville Sounds – backing vocals
The Nashville String Machine – strings
George Osaki – art direction
Hargus "Pig" Robbins – piano
Hal Rugg – steel guitar
Dennis Solee – saxophone
Bobby Thompson – rhythm guitar
Bill Vandevort – engineer
Pete Wade – electric guitar
Reggie Young – electric guitar

Chart positions 
Singles – Billboard (North America)

References 

1982 albums
Loretta Lynn albums
Albums produced by Owen Bradley
MCA Records albums